Victor Naicu (born 29 October 1973) is a former Romanian professional footballer, currently a manager.

References

External links
 
 

1973 births
Living people
Romanian footballers
Liga I players
Liga II players
FC U Craiova 1948 players
AFC Rocar București players
FCV Farul Constanța players
CS Pandurii Târgu Jiu players
Chinese Super League players
Yunnan Hongta players
Chongqing Liangjiang Athletic F.C. players
CS Minerul Motru players
Romanian football managers
CS Universitatea Craiova managers
ACS Viitorul Târgu Jiu managers
Romanian expatriate footballers
Expatriate footballers in China
Romanian expatriate sportspeople in China
Association football defenders
Sportspeople from Craiova